Thelma is a 1918 British silent drama film directed by A.E. Coleby, Arthur Rooke and starring Malvina Longfellow, Arthur Rooke and Maud Yates. It was adapted from the 1887 novel Thelma by Marie Corelli.

Cast
 Malvina Longfellow as Thelma
 Arthur Rooke as Sir Phillip Errington
 Maud Yates as Violet Vere
 Marsh Allen as Sir Francis Lennox
 Leal Douglas as The Blonde
 Humberston Wright as George Lorimer
 Judd Green as Olaf Olsen

References

External links

1918 films
British silent feature films
1918 drama films
Films directed by Arthur Rooke
Films based on British novels
Films based on works by Marie Corelli
British drama films
British black-and-white films
1910s English-language films
1910s British films
Silent drama films